"St. Petersburg" is a song from British rock band Supergrass' fifth studio album, Road to Rouen (2005). It was released on 8 August 2005, as the first single from the album, and charted at number 22 on the UK Singles Chart. As of January 2022, it is their most recent UK Top 40 Hit. Borkur Sigthorsson directed the song's music video.

Music video
The music video begins the same time as the song starts, focusing on a shot of the microphone on its stand. Gaz Coombes then comes into view, singing the first line of the song, and the camera rotates slowly around the rest of the band. The video is set in a completely white room, with the band demurely dressed, and a distinct red wooden piano being played by Rob Coombes.

Track listings
CD (CDR6670)
 "St. Petersburg" (3:13)
 "Kiss of Life" (live) (4:01)
 "Bullet" (live) (3:26)

Limited-edition red 7-inch (R6670)
 "St. Petersburg" (3:13)
 "Kiss of Life" (live) (4:01)

References

Supergrass songs
2005 singles
2005 songs
Parlophone singles